A Markov partition in mathematics is a tool used in dynamical systems theory, allowing the methods of  symbolic dynamics to be applied to the study of hyperbolic dynamics.  By using a Markov partition, the system can be made to resemble a discrete-time Markov process, with the long-term dynamical characteristics of the system represented as a Markov shift.  The appellation 'Markov' is appropriate because the resulting dynamics of the system obeys the Markov property. The Markov partition thus allows standard techniques from symbolic dynamics to be applied, including the computation of expectation values, correlations, topological entropy, topological zeta functions, Fredholm determinants and the like.

Motivation 

Let  be a discrete dynamical system.

Suppose that  has been divided into a number of pieces  which are thought to be as small and localized, with virtually no overlaps. The behavior of a point  under the iterates of  can be tracked by recording, for each , the part  which contains . This results in an infinite sequence on the alphabet  which encodes the point. In general, this encoding may be imprecise (the same sequence may represent many different points) and the set of sequences which arise in this way may be difficult to describe. Under certain conditions, which are made explicit in the rigorous definition of a Markov partition, the assignment of the sequence to a point of  becomes an almost one-to-one map whose image is a symbolic dynamical system of a special kind called a shift of finite type. In this case, the symbolic representation is a powerful tool for investigating the properties of the dynamical system .

Formal definition
A Markov partition is a finite cover of the invariant set of the manifold by a set of curvilinear rectangles  such that

 For any pair of points , that 
  for 

 
These last two conditions can be understood as a statement of the Markov property for the symbolic dynamics; that is, the movement of a trajectory from one open cover to the next is determined only by the most recent cover, and not the history of the system. It is this property of the covering that merits the 'Markov' appellation. The resulting dynamics is that of a Markov shift; that this is indeed the case is due to theorems by Yakov Sinai (1968) and Rufus Bowen (1975), thus putting symbolic dynamics on a firm footing.

Variants of the definition are found, corresponding to conditions on the geometry of the pieces .

Examples 
Markov partitions have been constructed in several situations.

 Anosov diffeomorphisms of the torus.
 Dynamical billiards, in which case the covering is countable.

Markov partitions make homoclinic and heteroclinic orbits particularly easy to describe.

For example: .

References 

 
 

Dynamical systems
Symbolic dynamics
Diffeomorphisms
Markov models